Oaks Corners is a hamlet in Ontario County, New York, United States. Oaks Corners has a post office with ZIP code 14518.

References

Hamlets in Ontario County, New York
Hamlets in New York (state)